John Duggan (6 November 1902 – 17 August 1990) was an Irish hurler. His inter-county career with the Kilkenny senior hurling team lasted from 1929 until 1938.

Biography

Raised near Mullinavat, County Kilkenny, Duggan was one of nine children born to Denis Duggan, a farmer, and his wife Bridget.

Duggan first came to prominence as a hurler with the Knockmoylan team that won the Kilkenny Junior Championship in 1926, however, the team was later stripped of the title. With the Monncoin club Duggan won five Kilkenny Senior Championship medals between 1927 and 1938.

Duggan first played at inter-county level as a member of the Kilkenny junior hurling team in 1928 before making his senior debut the following year. Over the course of the next decade he won three All-Ireland medals and six Leinster Championship medals. An All-Ireland runner-up on three occasions, Duggan was captained the team in 1937.

Honours

Mooncoin
Kilkenny Senior Hurling Championship (5): 1927, 1928, 1929, 1932, 1936

Kilkenny
All-Ireland Senior Hurling Championship (3): 1932, 1933, 1935
Leinster Senior Hurling Championship (6): 1931, 1932, 1933, 1935, 1936, 1937 (c)
National Hurling League (1): 1932–33

References

1902 births
1990 deaths
Knockmoylan hurlers
Mooncoin hurlers
Kilkenny inter-county hurlers
All-Ireland Senior Hurling Championship winners